There are 190 schools that hold the Association to Advance Collegiate Schools of Business's (AACSB) Accounting Accreditation. The AACSB accredits business schools by evaluating critical areas of each school to ensure that it provides top-quality education, and schools can apply for the accounting accreditation, which focuses on the schools' accounting programs, in addition to business accreditation.

Accreditation is gained and maintained via a peer-review system, and schools are assessed in the context of their respective missions rather than against a fixed standard. To apply for accounting accreditation, a school is required either to already hold the business accreditation, or to apply for both the business and accounting accreditations at the same time.

The initial accounting accreditation process starts with the submission of an eligibility application, and includes self-evaluations and peer reviews. The business school and the accounting academic unit are evaluated on their alignment with the AACSB's accreditation standards; under the standard for accounting accreditation, an accounting academic unit is evaluated based on its mission, intellectual contributions, and financial strategies for achieving its mission. For example, one of the bases of evaluation is whether the academic unit has produced intellectual contributions that have affected accounting, business and management "in ways that are consistent with the mission, expected outcomes, and strategies of the unit". Subsequently, the accounting accreditation is extended via 5-year review cycles.

As of 2013, the AACSB estimated that 5% of all business programs internationally, and most top business programs in the United States, held AACSB accreditation. AACSB accreditation is seen as a standard requirement in graduate business education, and universities are more likely to accept transfer credit earned from accredited schools;  it has been called "the hallmark of excellence in business education".

Schools

See also 
 Regional accreditation
 Triple accreditation

References 

!
Accounting education